
Brega may refer to:

Brega (also Mersa Brega or Marsa al-Brega (Arabic: مرسى البريقة Marsā al Burayqah, "Brega Seaport")), an inhabited location in Libya
Marsa Brega Airport, the airport for Brega
Brega, a petty kingdom north of Dublin in medieval Ireland

People
 Kings of Brega, Irish kings ruling Mag Breg (the plain of Brega), north and west of modern Dublin
 Mario Brega (1923–1994), Italian actor
 Oleg Brega (born 1973),  journalist, activist and filmmaker from Moldova
 Gheorghe Brega (born 1951), Moldovan politician
 Goran Bregović (born 1950), Bosnian musician nicknamed Brega

Battles

World War II
Battle of Brega (1941), part of the Western Desert Campaign of World War II

Libyan civil war
First Battle of Brega, fought on March 2, 2011
Second Battle of Brega, fought March 13 to 15, 2011
Third Battle of Brega, fought March 31 to April 7, 2011
Battle of Brega–Ajdabiya road, fought April 8, 2011 to July 14, 2011
Fourth Battle of Brega, fought beginning July 14, 2011

Music
Brega (music), a style of Brazilian popular song
Tecno brega, a form of music originating from Brazil

Corporations
Brega Marketing Company, a Libyan company for marketing oil